Terence Arthur Jolley (born 13 April 1959) was an English footballer active in the 1970s. He made 14 appearances in The Football League for Gillingham.

References

Living people
1959 births
English footballers
Association football forwards
English Football League players
Gillingham F.C. players
Place of birth missing (living people)
20th-century English people